Mantario is a special service area in the Rural Municipality of Chesterfield No. 261 in the Canadian province of Saskatchewan.It held village status prior to June 30, 2007. The population was five people in 2011.

Mantario is a portmanteau of Manitoba and Ontario. It was named after two provinces in imitation of nearby Alsask.

Demographics 

See also 
 List of communities in Saskatchewan
 List of hamlets in Saskatchewan
 List of geographic names derived from portmanteaus

References 

Chesterfield No. 261, Saskatchewan
Designated places in Saskatchewan
Former villages in Saskatchewan
Special service areas in Saskatchewan
Populated places disestablished in 2007
Division No. 8, Saskatchewan